Petr Mukhamedovich Khamukov (Russian: Пётр Мухамедович Хамуков; born 15 July 1991) is a Russian amateur boxer of the light heavyweight class (formerly a middleweight). Member of the Russian Olympic Team for the 2016 Summer Olympics in Rio de Janeiro and the only active Russian boxer to hold two Olympic licenses in middleweight and light heavyweight.

Amateur career 
 2010
 vice-champion of Russia
 2012
 Russian Championship bronze medal
 winner of the Great Silk Road Tournament (Baku, AZ)
 2013
 Giraldo-Cordova Cardin Tournament Sala-Kid Chocolate tournament winner
 Gee-Bee International Tournament winner
 2014
 vice-champion of Russia
 2015
 EUBC Amateur Championship winner
 2016
 upweighted to 81 kg
 Canaria Gran Boxeo Open winner
 2016 Aiba World Olympic Qualifying Tournament bronze medalist and olympic license winner
 2016 Russian Championship gold medal

2016 Olympics 
In 2015, Petr Khamukov wins his first Olympic license in middleweight after a sequence of successful matches in AIBA's semi-professional World Series of Boxing events.

In 2016, Petr decides to upweight to light heavyweight division, since Russian Olympic Team didn't have a licensed olympian for this weight. To acquire the license, Petr enters the 2016 AIBA World Olympic Qualifying Tournament and wins three bouts against Sadiq Umar (NGR), Denis Lazar (SLO) and Sumit Sangwan (IND).

In July 2016, Petr Khamukov is officially announced as Russian Olympic Team member in light heavyweight-class boxing.

References

External links 
 
 
 
 

Russian male boxers
Middleweight boxers
Light-heavyweight boxers
Olympic boxers of Russia
Boxers at the 2016 Summer Olympics
1991 births
Living people
People from Labinsk
Sportspeople from Krasnodar Krai